"If You Could See Me Now" is a song by Irish pop rock band The Script, taken from their third studio album, #3 (2012). The song video was released as the album's third single on 18 February 2013. The song was released on 4 March 2013. The track was written by Danny O'Donoghue, Mark Sheehan, Steve Kipner and Andrew Frampton.

Music video
A music video to accompany the release of "If You Could See Me Now" was first released onto YouTube on 18 February 2013 at a total length of three minutes and forty-nine seconds.

Live performances
On 25 January 2013 they performed the song live on The Graham Norton Show. They also performed the single on "Let's Dance for Sport Relief".

Track listing

Chart performance and Certification

Charts

Year-end charts

Certifications

Release history

References

2013 singles
The Script songs
2012 songs
Songs written by Steve Kipner
Phonogenic Records singles
Songs inspired by deaths
Songs written by Danny O'Donoghue
Songs written by Mark Sheehan
Songs written by Andrew Frampton (songwriter)